The HP Pavilion dv6000 series is a discontinued sub-line of a HP Pavilion laptops line with 15.4" 16:10 screens.

Models

Pavilion dv6000

Pavilion dv6058cl

Pavilion dv6120us 

 Processor: Intel core duo T2250 (1.73 GHz 2 MB L2 Cache)
 Memory: 1 GB (2 slots) DDR2
 Graphics: Mobile Intel(R) Express Chipset Family (Video Memory - Up to 256 MB dedicated)
 Storage: 120 GB SATA HDD

Pavilion dv6200

Pavilion dv6500

Pavilion dv6500tse (Special Edition)

Pavilion dv6618eo

Pavilion dv6767tx
Processor:	Intel Core 2 Duo T5550 (1.83 GHz 2 MB L2 Cache)
Memory: Up to 16GB (2 slots) DDR2
Graphics: NVIDIA GeForce 8400M GS (Video Memory - Up to 256 MB dedicated)
Storage	250 GB (5400 rpm) SATA HDD
Optical Drive	LightScribe SuperMulti 8X DVD±RW with Double Layer Support
Display	15.4” BrightView WXGA (1280 x 800) TN
Network:	Ethernet 10/100BT integrated network interface; High speed 56K modem
Wireless:	Intel PRO/Wireless 4965AGN; Bluetooth; Consumer IR
Media:	Altec Lansing speakers; web camera
Keyboard	101 key compatible
Pointing Device	Touch Pad with On/Off button and dedicated vertical Scroll Up/Down pad, volume control, mute buttons, 2 *Quick Launch Buttons
1 PC Card Slot
1 ExpressCard/54 slot (also supports ExpressCard/34)
5-in-1 integrated Digital Media Reader (MMC, SD cards, Memory Stick, Memory Stick Pro, or xD Picture cards)
3 USB 2.0
1 VGA port
1 HDMI
1 RJ11 modem connector
1 RJ45 Ethernet connector
Expansion Port 3 (for HP xb3000 dock)
S-video TV out
2 headphones-out
1 mic-in
1 IEEE 1394
AC adapter
Dimensions:	mm: 357 x 257 x 25.4-43 (LxWxH)
Weight:	2.78 kg
Power:90 W AC Power Adapter; 6-cell Li-Ion battery

 Drivers

References

Pavilion dv6000 series